The Outside Man (French: Un homme est mort) is a 1972 French-Italian thriller set in Los Angeles, directed by Jacques Deray and starring Jean-Louis Trintignant, Ann-Margret, Roy Scheider, and Angie Dickinson.

Plot
A contract on the life of Kovacs, a major California mobster, is given to Lucien, a hitman in France. Flying to Los Angeles, he checks into a hotel and drives out to the victim's luxurious home. Finding the man alone, he shoots him dead and makes his getaway. Back at the hotel, he discovers that his room has been stripped, including his passport and plane ticket. Emerging, he finds that he is being trailed by a hitman, who keeps trying to shoot him. To evade his pursuer, he takes a woman hostage and holes up in her apartment. On the TV news he sees the report of Kovacs' murder, but the description of the suspect does not fit him at all.

With only a gun and some money, and being pursued, he cannot survive long. He calls up his boss in Paris, Antoine, who tells him to find an old friend, Nancy, who works in a topless bar. She hides him and organises a passport. When Lucien's pursuer, Lenny, finds the two of them in a motel, Lucien captures him and explains the situation. Lucien was hired to eliminate Kovacs and Lenny was hired to eliminate Lucien, but who hired them? The answer is clear: it was Kovacs' son, who has inherited his father's profitable empire and his trophy wife. The two agree to tackle young Kovacs, but fall out and Lenny is killed. Antoine arrives from Paris to attend old Kovacs' funeral, which ends in a shoot-out. Antoine kills young Kovacs, but is then shot dead by the police. Lucien gets away, but dies of gunshot wounds.

Cast
 Jean-Louis Trintignant as Lucien Bellon
 Ann-Margret as Nancy Robson
 Angie Dickinson as Jackie Kovacs
 Roy Scheider as Lenny
 Georgia Engel as Mrs. Barnes
 Felice Orlandi as Anderson
Carlo De Mejo as Karl
Michel Constantin as Antoine
Umberto Orsini as Alex
 Ted de Corsia as Victor
 Jackie Earle Haley as Eric
John Hillerman as Department Store Manager
Jon Korkes as First Hawk
Connie Kreski as Rosie
Ben Piazza as Desk Clerk
Alex Rocco as Miller
Talia Shire as Make-up Girl

References

External links
 
 
 

1972 films
1970s French-language films
1970s crime thriller films
United Artists films
Films scored by Michel Legrand
Films set in the United States
Films about contract killing
Films with screenplays by Jean-Claude Carrière
English-language French films